Movann is a lake at the northern end of the village of Sørbråten in Maridalen valley in Nordmarka, a forested part of Oslo, Norway. It has a train station on the Gjøvik Line. The population of Sørbråten is 317.

The name
The lake is named after the old farm Mo (Norse Mór) in Nittedal. The name of the farm is identical with the word mór m 'moor, heath'. The last element is vann 'water, lake'.

The name of the lake has now the form Movann, that is Bokmål (compare Sognsvann). The name and form of the railway station, Movatn, is Nynorsk.

References

Neighbourhoods of Oslo
Maridalen